The 2015 Atlantic Coast Conference men's soccer tournament is the 29th edition of the ACC Men's Soccer Tournament. The tournament decides the Atlantic Coast Conference champion and guaranteed representative into the 2015 NCAA Division I Men's Soccer Championship.

Qualification 

The top ten teams in the Atlantic Coast Conference earned a berth into the ACC Tournament. All rounds are held at the higher seed's home field.

Bracket

Schedule

Play-in round

Quarterfinals

Semifinals

Finals

All-Tournament team 

Paul Clowes, Clemson
Kyle Murphy, Clemson
Chris Hubbard, Notre Dame
Connor Klekota, Notre Dame
Brandon Aubrey, Notre Dame
Hendrik Hilpert, Syracuse
Julian Buescher, Syracuse
Miles Robinson, Syracuse
Ben Polk, Syracuse
Jacori Hayes, Wake Forest
Ian Harkes, Wake Forest

See also 
 Atlantic Coast Conference
 2015 Atlantic Coast Conference men's soccer season
 2015 NCAA Division I men's soccer season
 2015 NCAA Division I Men's Soccer Championship

References 

ACC Men's Soccer Tournament
Tournament
ACC Men's Soccer Tournament